Hensonville is a hamlet in the town of Windham, Greene County, United States. The zipcode is: 12439. The hamlet is the setting of Windham Town Hall, located at 371 NY-296, Hensonville, NY 12439.

Notes

Hamlets in Greene County, New York
Hamlets in New York (state)